The New Hampshire Wildcats football program is the intercollegiate American football team for the University of New Hampshire located in the U.S. state of New Hampshire. The Wildcats compete in the NCAA Division I Football Championship Subdivision (FCS) and are members of the Colonial Athletic Association (CAA). The team plays its home games at the 11,000 seat Wildcat Stadium in Durham, New Hampshire, and are led by head coach Ricky Santos.

The school has fielded a varsity football team annually since 1893, with the exception of one year during World War I and two years during World War II. Bill Bowes, who served as head coach from 1972 to 1998, is an inductee of the College Football Hall of Fame.

Conference affiliations 
 1893–1922: Independent
 1923–1946: New England Conference
 1947–1996: Yankee Conference
 1997–2006: Atlantic 10 Conference
 2007–present: Colonial Athletic Association

Home venues 
The Wildcats have played their home football games at several venues in Durham. Prior to the current stadium, which has been in use since 1936, the team played its home games on Memorial Field from 1921 through 1935. Memorial Field remains in use by the women's field hockey team. Memorial Field was constructed to "honor the memory of those New Hampshire men who gave their lives for their country during the great World War." Funded by donations from alumni, it was built on the site of the prior athletic field, which had been referred to as the College Oval.

 unknown–1920: College Oval
 Last game: November 6, 1920 vs. Colby
 1921–1935: Memorial Field
 First game: November 12, 1921 vs. Massachusetts Agricultural College
 Last game: November 9, 1935 vs. Tufts
 1936–present: Wildcat Stadium
 Originally known as Lewis Stadium / Lewis Field
 First game: September 26, 1936 vs. Lowell Textile Institute
 Dedicated: October 10, 1936 vs. Maine
 Named Cowell Stadium from 1952 through 2015
 Renamed Wildcat Stadium in 2016

Notable former players
Notable team captains during the program's early years include:
 E. Dewey Graham (captain 1919), went on to become head coach at Norwich University.
 Red Howard (freshman captain 1919), played varsity at Princeton and two seasons in the NFL in the mid-1920s.
 Dutch Connor (captain 1921), played two seasons in the NFL in the mid-1920s, and succeeded Graham as head coach at Norwich.
 Cy Wentworth (captain 1923 & 1924), played three seasons in the NFL in the late 1920s.

Notable alumni who played in the NFL, AFL or CFL include:

 WR Kamau Peterson (1997-2000)
 TB Jerry Azumah (1995–1998)
 WR David Ball (2003–2006)
 OL Jason Ball (1997–2001)
 DB Etienne Boulay (2002–2005)
 DL Joe Fleming (1991–1994)
 WR David Gamble (1990–1993)
 LB Dwayne Gordon (1989–1992)
 DB Corey Graham (2003–2007)
 WR R.J. Harris (2011–2014)
 LB Bruce Huther (1973–1976)
 RB Chad Kackert (2005–2009)
 OL Greg Krause (1994–1998)
 FB Dan Kreider (1995–1999)
 LB Dave Rozumek (1972–1975)
 LB Dwayne Sabb (1988–1991)
 QB Ricky Santos (2003–2007)
 TE Scott Sicko (2006–2009)
 RB Avrom Smith (1991–1994)
 DT Jared Smith (2009–2012)
 WR Randal Williams (1996–2000)

Alumni who are notable for other achievements, outside of playing professional football, include:
 QB John J. Ryan (1906), college sports head coach, including Wisconsin football and Marquette basketball
 RB Lou D'Allesandro (1958–1960), New Hampshire State Senator
 QB Ryan Day (1998–2001), Ohio State head coach
 DB Chip Kelly (1981–1984), NCAA and NFL coach
 LB Rod Langway (1975–1976), NHL player who played both football and ice hockey for UNH
 DB Sean McDonnell (1975–1978), Wildcats football head coach since 1999

Head coaches

The below table lists the win–loss record for head coaches throughout program history. The team had its first formal head coach, John Scannell, during the 1902 season. Some opponents in early years were high school teams; for example, the 1895 team did not face any college teams in its six-game schedule. Other opponents into the 1920s were military teams (different from service academy programs, such as Army); an example being the 1926 team facing the Quantico Marines.

The school was not a member of any conference prior to the 1923 season. Since 1973, the team has played in NCAA classifications with postseason tournaments (playoffs).

Updated through the abbreviated 2020 season, when the team played a single conference game in the Spring of 2021.

 The 1944 schedule was limited to four games, with players restricted to 17-year-olds and returning veterans.

 McDonnell began a medical leave at the start of the 2019 season, with Santos named interim head coach; McDonnell returned the following season.

Postseason appearances

Bowl games
The team has appeared in one bowl game during its history:

Notes:
 While listed in NCAA records, the Glass Bowl is not considered an NCAA-sanctioned bowl game.
 The Wildcats also played in one Division II playoff game that was known, for historical reasons, by a bowl name. As that game was part of a tournament bracket, it is not listed in this section (see below).

Division II playoffs
The team made the postseason twice during the time it competed in Division II (1973–1977), compiling an overall record of 1–2:

 In the 1975 NCAA Division II postseason, the Wildcats defeated Lehigh in the first round, 35–21. The Wildcats then played Western Kentucky in the 1975 Grantland Rice Bowl semifinal game, losing 14–3.
 In the 1976 NCAA Division II postseason, the Wildcats lost to Montana State in the first round, 17–16; Montana State went on to win the Division II championship.

Division I-AA/FCS playoffs
The Wildcats have appeared in the Division I-AA/FCS Playoffs 17 times, playing 32 postseason games. Their overall record is 15–17.

Rivalries

Maine

The football programs of New Hampshire and the Maine Black Bears first met in 1903, and have met annually since 1922, except for two season during World War II and during the 2020 season due to impact from the COVID-19 pandemic. Since 1948, the winning team gets possession of an antique musket until the next season's game. The teams met for the 100th time in 2010.

UMass

The football programs of New Hampshire and the UMass Minutemen first met in 1897, and most recently met in 2011. Since 1986, the most outstanding player of the matchup has been awarded the Bill Knight Trophy. However, the future of the rivalry is in question, as the two programs are now in different NCAA football classifications. The teams met for the 70th time in 2007.

Dartmouth

The football programs of New Hampshire and the Dartmouth Big Green first met in 1901, and most recently met in 2021. The teams met for the 35th time in 2007.

Donation controversy 
A longtime UNH librarian, Robert Morin, died in 2015 and left $4 million to the University; $1 million of that money was spent on a new video scoreboard for the football stadium, and the decision to spend so much of the donation on a scoreboard became a controversial topic. University officials explained that there was no instruction on how to spend the money, other than $100,000 for the library. It was also noted that Morin started watching and became particularly interested in football towards the end of his life.

Future non-conference opponents 
Announced schedules as of December 12, 2022.

Notes

References

External links

 

 
American football teams established in 1893
1893 establishments in New Hampshire